Georg Goldberg (12 May 1830, Nuremberg - 25 July 1894, Munich) was a German copper and steel engraver of Jewish descent.

Biography
Georg Goldberg studied in Nuremberg with Johann Leonhard Raab and at the Academy of Fine Arts, Nuremberg. He left for Munich in 1856, where he created most of his works. By 1890 he was a member of the Allgemeine Deutsche Kunstgenossenschaft.

Works

 Bacchus und Ariadne, after Jacopo Tintoretto;
 Die Grablegung, after Giorgione;
 Illustrations for Alexander von Liezen-Mayer's scenes of Goethe's Faust;
 Das Erwachen des Frühlings, after Ernst Kaiser;
 Portrait of Oscar II of Sweden
 Joan of Arc (from Friedrich Schiller's The Maid of Orleans, for the 1859 publication Schiller-Galerie.
 Scenes for Friedrich Pecht's 1876 publication Shakespeare-Galerie

References

Sources
 Verzeichniss der Abbildungen, in: Schiller-Galerie. Charaktere aus Schillers Werken. Gezeichnet von Friedrich Pecht und Arthur von Ramberg, Fünfzig Blätter in Stahlstich mit erläuterndem Texte von Friedrich Pecht, F. A. Brockhaus, Leipzig 1859 (online version)
 Hermann Alexander Müller: Goldberg, Georg, in Biographisches Künstler-Lexikon. Verlag des Bibliographischen Instituts, Leipzig, 1882, p. 212.
 Salomon Wininger: Große jüdische National-Biographie. Mit mehr als 8000 Lebensbeschreibungen namhafter jüdischer Männer und Frauen aller Zeiten und Länder. Ein Nachschlagewerk für das jüdische Volk und dessen Freunde. Band 2, Chernivtsi 1927, p. 440.
 Manfred H. Grieb: Nürnberger Künstlerlexikon. Bildende Künstler, Kunsthandwerker, Gelehrte, Sammler, Kulturschaffende und Mäzene vom 12. bis zur Mitte des 20. Jahrhunderts. Walter de Gruyter, Berlin 2007, p. 493. online version

1830 births
1894 deaths
19th-century German Jews
German engravers